Tracy Velazquez was the Vice Chair of the Montana Democratic Party and directed the Justice Policy Institute in Washington D.C. until February 2013.

Velazquez has run for public office three times.  She first ran for state legislature in 2000 against Republican incumbent Bob Davies.  In 2004, she challenged Montana Congressman Dennis Rehberg for the state's lone seat in the U.S. House of Representatives.  In 2006, she again ran for the state legislature, this time losing a contested Democratic primary to Mike Phillips.

She was elected Vice Chair of the Montana Democratic Party in 2005.

Velazquez also owns Commonweal Consulting, which provides capacity building services to non-profit agencies and public health policy consulting to NGOs and local governments.  Notably, Velazquez assisted the town of Libby, Montana in its fight for healthcare for residents sickened by asbestos from the local W.R. Grace mine.

Velazquez is considered a liberal Democrat, and has from time to time taken positions outside of the party mainstream.  For example, in late 2005, she received broad national attention by organizing a group to recommend paying for Hurricane Katrina relief by reducing pork barrel spending, asking the Bozeman city council to return federal earmarked money for a parking garage.  While her actions were criticized by Democratic Senator Max Baucus, as well as Republicans Rehberg and then-Senator Conrad Burns. She was also hailed as a founder of a movement to reduce wasteful spending in Washington.

Born in 1964 in Connecticut, Velazquez has a bachelor's degree from Harvard University and a Masters in Public Administration from Montana State University.  She has three children and is married to Dennis Alexander.

External links
 Montana Democratic Party

1964 births
Living people
People from Connecticut
Harvard University alumni
Montana State University alumni
Politicians from Bozeman, Montana
Montana Democrats
Women in Montana politics
21st-century American women